Hilda Maria Hannunen (29 August 1882, Laukaa – ?) was a Finnish weaver and politician. She was a member of the Parliament of Finland, representing the Social Democratic Party of Finland from 1920 to 1922 and the Socialist Workers' Party of Finland (SSTP) from 1922 to 1923. When the SSTP was banned in 1923, she emigrated to the Soviet Union, where she subsequently worked as the director of a retirement home.

References

1882 births
Year of death unknown
People from Laukaa
People from Vaasa Province (Grand Duchy of Finland)
Social Democratic Party of Finland politicians
Socialist Workers Party of Finland politicians
Members of the Parliament of Finland (1919–22)
Members of the Parliament of Finland (1922–24)
Women members of the Parliament of Finland
Finnish emigrants to the Soviet Union